Castle Creek is a hamlet in Broome County, New York, United States. Castle Creek has a post office with ZIP code 13744, which opened on December 23, 1845.

References

Hamlets in Broome County, New York
Hamlets in New York (state)